Fromberg can refer to:
 Richard Fromberg, tennis player
 Pieter Hendrik Fromberg Sr., a Dutch colonial expert on Chinese affairs
 Fromberg, Montana
 Fromberg (Netherlands), a village in the province of Limburg